The 1994 ICC Trophy (formally the ABN AMRO ICC Trophy) was a cricket tournament that took place in Kenya between 12 February and 6 March 1994. It was the fifth ICC Trophy tournament to be staged, and acted as the Cricket World Cup qualification tournament for the 1996 Cricket World Cup.

Zimbabwe, the winners of the previous three tournaments, had been granted Full membership of the International Cricket Council (ICC) in 1992 and so were no longer eligible to participate in the ICC Trophy. They automatically qualified for the World Cup.

For the first time three spots were on offer to qualify for the World Cup, and matches were played over 50 overs a side, though white clothing and red balls were still used.

The United Arab Emirates won the tournament, defeating host nation Kenya in the final, while the Netherlands won the third place play-off. All three sides thus qualified for the World Cup for the first time. 

Being group champion, USA and PNG team qualified for plate final, but due to prescheduled flight schedule Namibia and Denmark played the plate final.

Teams and squads

Twenty teams contested the tournament. All twenty associate members of the International Cricket Council (ICC) at the time were eligible to compete at the tournament and participated. Ireland, Namibia, and the United Arab Emirates were making their tournament debuts.

First round

Group A

Group B

Group C

Group D

Second round

Group E

Group F

Finals

Semi-finals
Of the four semi-finalists, Kenya and the Netherlands had made the semi-finals at the previous tournament in 1990, Bermuda had last made the semi-finals at the 1986 tournament, and the United Arab Emirates were making their tournament debut.

Third-place play-off
The third-place play-off determined the twelfth and final team at the 1996 World Cup.

Final

Plate competition
The plate competition was contested by the teams finishing third and fourth in each first-round group.

Group G

Group H

Final

Wooden spoon competition

The wooden spoon competition was contested by the teams finishing last in each first-round group.

Statistics

Most runs
The top five run scorers (total runs) are included in this table, ordered by runs, then by batting average, and then alphabetically.

Source: CricketArchive

Most wickets

The top five wicket takers are listed in this table, listed by wickets taken and then by bowling average.

Source: CricketArchive

See also
ICC Trophy
1996 Cricket World Cup

References

External links
1994 ICC Trophy page on Cricket Archive

1994 in Kenyan cricket
Icc Trophy, 1994
Kenyan cricket seasons to 1999–2000
Sport in Nairobi
ICC World Cup Qualifier
International cricket competitions in Kenya